High Adventure is the fourth studio album by American singer-songwriter Kenny Loggins, released in September 1982. It is best known for its top 40 pop singles "Heart to Heart", "Heartlight" and "Don't Fight It"; the latter was co-written by Journey frontman Steve Perry, who also performs on the track. Neil Giraldo, Pat Benatar's husband and guitarist is featured. "Don't Fight It" was nominated for a Grammy Award for Best Rock Performance by a Duo or Group with Vocal.

Track listing
"Don't Fight It" (Featuring Steve Perry) (Kenny Loggins, Steve Perry, Dean Pitchford) – 3:37
"Heartlight" (K. Loggins) – 3:56
"I Gotta Try" (K. Loggins, Michael McDonald) – 3:51
"Swear Your Love" (K. Loggins, Eva Ein Loggins) – 5:07
"The More We Try" (K. Loggins, E. Loggins) – 3:59
"Heart to Heart" (David Foster, K. Loggins, McDonald) – 5:20
"If It's Not What You're Looking For" (K. Loggins, Foster, E. Loggins) – 4:39
"It Must Be Imagination" (K. Loggins, Tom Snow, Max Gronenthal) – 5:38
"Only a Miracle" (K. Loggins, McDonald) – 5:11

Personnel 

 Kenny Loggins – lead vocals, rhythm guitar (1), guitar (2, 4), guitar solo (2)
 Michael McDonald – keyboards (3), Rhodes piano, backing vocals (6) synthesizer programming, acoustic piano (9)
 Steve Wood – keyboards (3, 7), additional keyboards (5), backing vocals (7, 8) Yamaha GS-1 (8), Yamaha CS-20 (8)
 Neil Larsen – additional keyboards (5), string arrangement (6), keyboards (7)
 James Newton Howard – Prophet 10 (5), Yamaha CS-70 (5), Yamaha GS-1 (5, 9), synthesizer and string arrangements (5), acoustic piano (9)
 David Paich – Yamaha CS-20 (5)
 David Foster – grand piano (6), string arrangements (6)
 Tom Snow – Prophet 5 (8)
 Albhy Galuten – Synclavier (8)
 Neil Giraldo – lead guitar (1), rhythm guitar (1), guitar (8)
 Steve Lukather – guitar (3)
 Mike Hamilton – bass (1), guitar (2-8), orchestra bells (3), guitar solo (4), backing vocals (7)
 Vernon Porter – bass (2, 4)
 Abraham Laboriel – bass (3)
 Darek Jackson – bass (6)
 Nathan East – bass (7)
 Dennis Conway – drums (1)
 Tris Imboden – percussion (1), drums (2-8)
 Steve Forman – percussion (2)
 Paulinho da Costa – congas (2, 6)
 Lenny Castro – percussion (6)
 Jon Clarke – recorder (5)
 David Sanborn – alto saxophone (6)
 Marty Paich – string arrangements (6, 9)
 Steve Perry – lead and backing vocals (1)
 The Heartlight School Singers and Dancers Christ Memorial Youth Choir – choir (2)
 Phyllis St. James – choir contractor (2) 
 B. J. Crouch – choir director (2)
 Mrs. Norman Basely – choir director (2)
 Richard Page – backing vocals (3, 6)
 Steve George – backing vocals (3, 6)
 Max Gronenthal – backing vocals (8)

Production 
 Producers – Bruce Botnick and Kenny Loggins
 Recording Engineers – Bruce Botnick (Tracks 1, 3, & 6); Mark Ettel (Tracks 2, 4, 5, 7, & 8); Andy Johns (Track 2); Armin Steiner (Tracks 5 & 9).
 Mixdown Engineers – Bruce Botnick, Mark Ettel and Rik Pekkonen.
 Digital Mixdown and Editing by Jim Pace at Digital Magnetics (Hollywood, California).
 Mastered by Bernie Grundman at A&M Studios (Hollywood).
 Technicians – Nigel Branwell, Torin Knorr and Jerry Smith.
 Album Cover and Title Concept – Kenny Loggins and Paul Mederios
 Illustration – Jim Heimann
 Photography – Greg Gorman
 Management – Larry Larson & Associates (Beverly Hills, California).

References 

1982 albums
Kenny Loggins albums
Albums produced by Bruce Botnick
Albums produced by David Foster
Columbia Records albums